There were 373 candidates contesting 125 seats at the 1901 New South Wales state election which was held on 3 July 1901.

Since the previous election in 1898, the Protectionist Party (or National Federal Party) had become the Progressive Party, while the Free Trade Party had become the Liberal Reform Party.

Retiring members

Progressive
Joseph Abbott MLA (Wentworth)
John Chanter MLA (Deniliquin) — elected to the federal House of Representatives
Austin Chapman MLA (Braidwood) — elected to the federal House of Representatives
Francis Clarke MLA (Hastings and Macleay) — elected to the federal House of Representatives
George Cruickshank MLA (Inverell) — elected to the federal House of Representatives
Thomas Ewing MLA (Lismore) — elected to the federal House of Representatives
Thomas Goodwin MLA (Gunnedah)
Thomas Hassall MLA (Moree)
William Sawers MLA (Tamworth) — elected to the federal House of Representatives
Dugald Thomson MLA (Warringah) — elected to the federal House of Representatives.

Liberal
Joseph Cook MLA (Hartley) — elected to the federal House of Representatives
Francis Cotton MLA (Newtown-Camperdown)
Sir Matthew Harris MLA (Sydney-Denison)
Francis McLean MLA (Marrickville) — elected to the federal House of Representatives
John Neild MLA (Paddington) — elected to the federal Senate
George Reid MLA (Sydney-King) — elected to the federal House of Representatives
Bill Wilks MLA (Balmain North) — elected to the federal House of Representatives

Labor
Thomas Brown MLA (Condoublin) — elected to the federal House of Representatives
Billy Hughes MLA (Sydney-King) — elected to the federal House of Representatives
William Spence MLA (Cobar) — elected to the federal House of Representatives
Josiah Thomas MLA (Alma) — elected to the federal House of Representatives
James Thomson MLA (Newcastle West)
David Watkins MLA (Wallsend) — elected to the federal House of Representatives
Chris Watson MLA (Young) — elected to the federal House of Representatives

Independent
John McLaughlin MLA (Raleigh)

Legislative Assembly
Sitting members are shown in bold text. Successful candidates are highlighted in the relevant colour.

See also
 Members of the New South Wales Legislative Assembly, 1901–1904
 Results of the 1901 New South Wales state election

Notes

References

1901